Civilis may refer to:

Gaius Julius Civilis, the leader of the Batavian rebellion against the Romans in 69
Tiberius Claudius Civilis
Civilis (vicarius), a vicarius of Roman Britain in 368
Raimundas Čivilis, a former Lithuanian basketball player